Kullervo is a given name. Notable people with the name include:

Kullervo Leskinen (1908–1989), Finnish sports shooter
Kullervo Manner (1880–1939), Finnish journalist and politician

Finnish masculine given names